Donna Jean Cook [״Cookie״] (May 24, 1928 – October 16, 2006) was a pitcher and outfielder who played from  through  in the All-American Girls Professional Baseball League.

Donna Cook played for eight different teams of the All-American Girls Professional Baseball League in a span of nine years. She moved around for a while, as the league usually shifted players as needed to help some teams stay afloat.

Born in Muskegon, Michigan, Donna was one of twelve children into the family of Sidney and Daisy (née Johnson) Cook. She played five years of organized softball before joining the league with her hometown team, just days after graduating from Muskegon Heights High School.

In 1946 Cook opened at right field for the Muskegon Lassies. She had a .156 average in 78 games. The next year she was switched to pitcher and became a proven starter, turning in a 14–8 record with a sparkling 1.42 earned run average, as the Lassies posted a 69‑43 record en route to win the regular season championship in a close pennant race. Muskegon, managed by Bill Wambsganss, nailed down the victory with two days remaining on the schedule, though the team was eliminated in the playoffs by a strong Racine Belles squad. During a stretch in the season, Cook won four games in a week and belted two home runs in a game. In addition, she ended fourth in the league for the best winning percentage (.636) and tenth in ERA.

Cook started 1948 with Muskegon, but was traded to the Chicago Colleens in the midseason and ended the year with the Fort Wayne Daisies, which took a toll on her performance, dropping to a 4–9 record with a 4.03 ERA. She made a successful comeback for the Daisies in 1949, evening her record at 9–9 with a 1.94 ERA in 22 pitching appearances. Unfortunately, she injured a knee toward the end of the season, which affected her for the rest of her career.

She slumped considerably for the next five years, pitching in only 32 games with the Grand Rapids Chicks (1950), Battle Creek/Muskegon Belles (1951–1953), South Bend Blue Sox (1953) and Rockford Peaches (1954). Her younger sister, Doris Cook, also played in the league. The sisters came together in South Bend.

After baseball Cook worked as a bank teller at Comerica Bank in Muskegon during 25 years. She also had three surgeries on her injured knee.

Since 1988 she is part of Women in Baseball, a permanent display based at the Baseball Hall of Fame and Museum in Cooperstown, New York, which was unveiled to honor the entire All-American Girls Professional Baseball League. She also was inducted into the Muskegon Area Sports Hall of Fame along with her sister Doris in 1993.

Donna Cook died in 2006 in North Muskegon, Michigan, at the age of 79.

Career statistics
Pitching

Batting

Fielding

Sources

All-American Girls Professional Baseball League players
Muskegon Lassies players
Chicago Colleens players
Fort Wayne Daisies players
Grand Rapids Chicks players
Battle Creek Belles players
South Bend Blue Sox players
Rockford Peaches players
Baseball players from Michigan
Sportspeople from Muskegon, Michigan
1928 births
2006 deaths
Muskegon Belles players
20th-century American women
20th-century American people
21st-century American women